Meethi Choori No 1 is a 2010 Indian reality show aired on Imagine TV starring several Indian television actresses. It was produced by SOL Productions.

Concept 
The show was a chat show which includes 8 actresses, from among whom a few actresses are changed per episode. The show worked on a structure that followed a panel-based judgment ranking on the actresses' submitted videos or pictures about a particular subject (usually including s the sex appeal factor) and then the ladies were asked to rate their fellow contestants on a scale of 1 to 8 for a given question, where it was emphasized that "acquiring rank 1 is not a good deal here!". The same question was also held as a survey among 100 men and if the ranking of any of the actresses match with the survey ranking then she won Rs. 5 lakh.

Episodes 
The show had about 10 episodes, including a special episode with 8 married television actresses and another episode with contestants from reality show Rahul Dulhaniya Le Jayega. Every episode had eight participants.

Hosts 
Television actors Jay Bhanushali and Shabbir Ahluwalia hosted all the episodes.

Participants 
Many popular television actresses appeared on the show. While most of the actresses appeared once or twice, a handful of them appeared regularly like Urvashi Dholakia & Ragini Khanna.
Urvashi Dholakia
Rakshanda Khan
Karishma Tanna
Ragini Khanna
Mona Singh
Neha Marda
Tanaaz Irani
Rashami Desai
Narayani Shastri
Rupali Ganguly
Kashmera Shah
Shilpa Saklani
Poonam Narula
Roshni Chopra
Ashita Dhawan
Anmol Singh
Pragati Mehra
Tasneem Sheikh
Yami Gautam
Sukirti Kandpal 
Abigail Jain
Pooja Gor
Vibha Anand
Nigaar Khan
Keerti Gaekwad Kelkar
Jaya Bhattacharya
Sanaya Irani
Gauri Pradhan
Sriti Jha
Parul Yadav
Smriti Kalra
Dimpy Ganguly

References

2010 Indian television series debuts
Celebrity reality television series
Indian reality television series